Marianela is a Mexican telenovela directed by Ernesto Alonso for Telesistema Mexicano in 1961.

Cast 
 Magda Guzmán as Marianela
 Narciso Busquets as Pablo
 Sergio Jurado
 Aurora Molina
 Alicia Rodríguez
 Celia Manzano
 Eduardo Alcaraz

References

External links 

Mexican telenovelas
1961 telenovelas
Televisa telenovelas
1961 Mexican television series debuts
1961 Mexican television series endings
Spanish-language telenovelas